The Madison Vocation School Collegiate-Gothic-style structure begun in 1921 a block north of the capitol in Madison, Wisconsin. In 2019 it was added to the National Register of Historic Places.

History
In the early 1900s the Wisconsin legislature recognized that some youth who had not finished high school needed more education, and  passed the Continuation School Act in 1911. The Madison Continuation School opened the following year, providing instruction in the trades, "but also literature, math, social sciences and the arts, and help[ed] to fulfill a primary goal of public education: training for good citizenship."

The school's name was changed to Madison Vocational School in 1916 and it moved to this site in 1921, in a new building designed by Ferdinand Kronenberg, four stories of brick in Collegiate Gothic style. A 1949 addition designed by Law, Law, Potter and Nystrom was simpler in style, and was expanded in 1964.

Eventually, the school's name was changed again in 1967 to Madison Area Technical College. The college has since sold the building and it began a transformation into a hotel building.

References

School buildings on the National Register of Historic Places in Wisconsin
Hotel buildings on the National Register of Historic Places in Wisconsin
National Register of Historic Places in Madison, Wisconsin
Schools in Dane County, Wisconsin
Gothic Revival architecture in Wisconsin
School buildings completed in 1921
Brick buildings and structures
1921 establishments in Wisconsin